Enteromius aboinensis is a species of ray-finned fish in the genus Enteromius. It was described from the Amboina River in Niger, and has been reported from the Benue River.

Footnotes 

Enteromius
Taxa named by George Albert Boulenger
Fish described in 1911